Churchill is a village in the Wyre Forest District of Worcestershire, England, near to Kidderminster. It is in the civil parish of Churchill and Blakedown and is the location of one of the few surviving water-powered plating forges in the United Kingdom - Churchill Forge Mill.

References

Further reading
 A Pictorial History of Churchill and Blakedown, Churchill & Blakedown Parish Council

External links

Churchill & Blakedown Parish site

Villages in Worcestershire